History, formerly known as Fox History and The History Channel, is a television channel in Australia and New Zealand, that broadcasts non-fictional programs regarding historical events and persons, as well as various metaphysical, pseudoscientific, and paranormal phenomena—often with observations and explanations by noted historians, scholars, authors, esotericists, astrologers, and Biblical scholars as well as reenactments and interviews with witnesses, and/or families of witnesses.

The channel is operated by Foxtel Networks, and the programming and name of the channel is licensed to them by A&E Networks.

It started out as Fox History in 1996, and changed its name to The History Channel in November 1998. The channel used share its frequency with Fox Kids until December 2000, when it got its own 24-hour channel.

On 3 November 2014, History launched a high-definition feed.

Programmes

Original Programming

Acquired programming

References

History Channel
Television channels and stations established in 1996
1996 establishments in Australia
A&E Networks
Foxtel
English-language television stations in Australia
English-language television stations in New Zealand